The 2015–16 San Francisco Dons men's basketball team represented the University of San Francisco during the 2015–16 NCAA Division I men's basketball season. It was head coach Rex Walters eighth season at San Francisco. The Dons played their home games at the War Memorial Gymnasium and were members of the West Coast Conference. They finished the season 15–15, 8–10 in WCC play to finish in fifth place. They lost in the quarterfinals of the WCC tournament to Pepperdine.

On March 9, 2016, head coach Rex Walters was fired. He finished at San Francisco with an eight-year record of 126–125. On March 30, the school hired Kyle Smith as head coach.

Previous season 
The Dons finished the season 14–18, 7–11 in WCC play to finish in a three-way tie for sixth place. They advanced to the quarterfinals of the WCC tournament where they lost to Gonzaga.

Departures

Incoming Transfers

Recruiting Class of 2015

Roster

Schedule and results

|-
!colspan=12 style="background:#006633; color:#FFCC33;"| Exhibition

|-
!colspan=12 style="background:#006633; color:#FFCC33;"| Regular season

|-
!colspan=12 style="background:#006633; color:#FFCC33;"| WCC tournament

References

San Francisco Dons men's basketball seasons
San Francisco
San Francisco Dons
San Francisco Dons